"Batter Up" is a song by American hip hop group St. Lunatics, with member Nelly credited as a featured artist. The track was produced by Steve "Blast" Wills and first appeared on Nelly's debut solo album, Country Grammar (2000). It was later included on the group's album Free City (2001) as a bonus track. A remixed version of "Batter Up" appears on Nelly's album Da Derrty Versions: The Reinvention (2003).

The song's hook interpolates "Movin' On Up", the theme song of the television sitcom The Jeffersons. The show's star Sherman Hemsley appears in the music video for "Batter Up", initially as a sports announcer and later dancing with members of St. Lunatics.

Track listings
US 12-inch single
A1. "Batter Up" (clean version) – 5:27
A2. "Batter Up" (dirty version) – 5:27
A3. "Batter Up" (instrumental) – 5:27
B1. "Luven Me" (clean version) – 4:07
B2. "Luven Me" (dirty version) – 4:07
B3. "Luven Me" (instrumental) – 4:07

UK CD single
 "Batter Up" (Full Phatt radio edit) – 4:05
 "Batter Up" (album version) – 5:27
 "Icey" – 4:14
 "Batter Up" (video)

UK 12-inch single
A1. "Batter Up" (Full Phatt radio edit)
B1. "Batter Up" (album version)
B2. "Batter Up" (instrumental)

European CD single
 "Batter Up" (radio edit) – 4:12
 "Batter Up" (Full Phatt radio edit) – 4:07

Australasian CD single
 "Batter Up" (radio edit) – 4:12
 "Batter Up" (Full Phatt radio edit) – 4:07
 "Batter Up" (instrumental) – 5:31
 "Batter Up" (Corporate's Burnt Bean mix) – 4:41

Charts

Weekly charts

Year-end charts

Certifications

Release history

References

2000 songs
2001 singles
Music videos directed by Marc Klasfeld
Nelly songs
Songs written by Jay E
Songs written by Nelly
Universal Records singles